Constantin Blaha (born 1 December 1987) is an Austrian diver who specializes in the 1 m and 3 m springboard events.

Career
He has represented his country during the 2008 Summer Olympics in Beijing where he failed to advance to the semifinal after classifying 22nd in the preliminary round of the men's 3 metre springboard.

He has also participated in both the 2009 and 2011 editions of the World Aquatics Championships: he was eliminated both times in the preliminary of the men's 3 m springboard, classifying 25th in 2009 and 19th in 2011, and also in the men's 1 m springboard, ranking 14th and 30th respectively.

He participated in the 2013 World Aquatics Championships in Barcelona, Spain and ranked 5th and 9th in Men's 1 and 3 metre springboard, respectively.

References

External links

Divers at the 2008 Summer Olympics
Divers at the 2016 Summer Olympics
Olympic divers of Austria
Austrian male divers
Living people
1987 births
Divers from Vienna